The 1871 City of Auckland West by-election was a by-election held  on 1 September 1871 in the  electorate during the 5th New Zealand Parliament. It was then a two-member electorate.

The by-election was caused by the resignation of the incumbent, John Williamson. His earlier election had been declared invalid, as he held the position of Commissioner of Crown Lands.

John Williamson was re-elected unopposed.

References 

Auckland West 1871
1871 elections in New Zealand
September 1871 events
Politics of the Auckland Region